Match TV is a Russian federal sports channel owned by Gazprom Media.

The channel began broadcasting on November 1, 2015 and was created in accordance with the order of Russian president Vladimir Putin, with the assistance of the editorial office of Gazprom-Media Holding, technical assistance of ANO Sports Broadcasting (Panorama's brand) and the frequency of Russia-2 (VGTRK). The general producer of the channel was Tina Kandelaki until she was replaced in September 2021 by Alexander Tashchin.

Main broadcasts of the channel

Football

National teams 
 UEFA Euro 2016
 2017 FIFA Confederations Cup
 Russia 2018 
 UEFA Euro 2020
 Qatar 2022

Club competitions 
 2019–20 UEFA Champions League
 2020–21 UEFA Champions League
 2021–22 UEFA Champions League
 2021-22 UEFA Europa League
 2021-22 UEFA Europa Conference League
 2021-22 Bundesliga
 2022-23 Bundesliga
 2022–23 Premier League (it was planned, but in response to the 2022 Russian invasion of Ukraine, English Premier League suspended its six-year deal with Match TV.)
 2022-23 UEFA Champions League
 2022-23 UEFA Europa League
 2022-23 UEFA Europa Conference League

Olympics 
 Tokyo 2020
 Beijing 2022

Ice Hockey

IIHF World Championship 
 2017
 2018
 2019
 2020 (it was planned, but the tournament was cancelled due to the COVID-19 pandemic)
 2021

"NHL on Match TV" 
 2020–21 NHL season (including the Playoffs and Final)
 2021–22 NHL season
 2022-23 NHL season

Formula One 
 2016 Season
 2017 Season
 2018 Season
 2019 Season
 2020 Season
 2021 Season

References

External links 
 Match TV on Facebook
 

Television channels and stations established in 2015
Russian-language television stations in Russia
Sports television networks in Russia
2015 establishments in Russia

Sanctioned due to Russo-Ukrainian War